United States national volleyball team may refer to:

 United States men's national volleyball team
 United States women's national volleyball team